Georgios Kalambokidis was a Greek sailor. He competed in the Star event at the 1948 Summer Olympics.

References

External links
 

Year of birth missing
Year of death missing
Greek male sailors (sport)
Olympic sailors of Greece
Sailors at the 1948 Summer Olympics – Star
Place of birth missing